Kue cucur (Indonesian) or kuih cucur (Malay), known in Thai as khanom fak bua or khanom chuchun ( or ), is a traditional snack from Indonesia, and popular in parts of Southeast Asia, includes Indonesia, Malaysia, southern Thailand and Singapore. In Indonesia, kue cucur can be found throughout traditional marketplaces in the country; the popular version, however, is the Betawi version from Jakarta. In Brunei and Malaysia, the term cucur is generally used to refer to any type of fritters. A popular type of cucur in Brunei and Malaysia is Jemput-jemput (also known as Cokodok) and Pinjaram (also known as Kuih cucur gula merah/melaka). In Southern Thailand, it is often featured in wedding ceremonies and festivals.

The dessert, made of fried rice flour mixed with palm sugar, is thick in the middle and thin at the edges. Thai people believe that it is similar to the lotus which can grow in poor conditions. Thus, it is like the love of a newly married couple that will smoothly grow up and succeed in married life. Thai people like to use it at a wedding or propitious ceremony, or at any festival. Sometimes it is given as a gift. Normally, Thai people like to eat it immediately after it is fried because it is still soft and colorful, and smells good. If it is left for an hour, it will be sticky, stiff and full of oil.

See also 

 Kue
 Jemput-jemput
 Pinjaram
 Serabi
 Pancakes
 Neyyappam, similar Indian snacks.

References

External links 
 Kue Cucur Recipe
 Kue Cucur Recipe 
 Pantip.com
 เสน่ห์ขนมไทย
 การทำขนมฝักบัว: ขนมฝักบัว
 ขนมฝักบัว: การทำขนมฝักบัว
 Thai PBS: ขนมไทยอะไรเอ่ย : ขนมฝักบัว
 เฮฮาไปกับ PP_NaNokuNg Mission Miss you!!จบภารกิจแล้วค่ะ 
วิธี และ เคล็ดลับ ในทุกๆเรื่อง ที่จะทำให้ชีวิตของคุณง่ายขึ้น

Kue
Malaysian snack foods
Thai desserts and snacks
Indonesian pancakes